Galeodes is a genus of solifuges or sun spiders. The nearly 200 species in this genus are found in northern Africa, southeastern Europe and Asia. Like other solifuges, they are mainly nocturnal and found in arid habitats. They often have long hairy appendages and are not as stout bodied or dark and contrastingly coloured as some other solifuges. Some Galeodes species are able to produce sounds by stridulation. These are usually raspy or hiss-like and may be imitations of the sounds of vipers, to serve a defensive function. As in other solifuges, mating involves the male depositing a spermatogonia that is manipulated into the female genital opening using their chelicera. The male strokes the female using the palps allowing her to be approached. Females will often feed on males before or after mating. The female then deposits the eggs in a burrow in soil and in some species guards them.

Species 
, the World Solifugae Catalog accepts the following 174 species:

 Galeodes abessinicus Roewer, 1934 — Ethiopia
 Galeodes adamsi (Turk, 1947) — Iraq
 Galeodes afghanus Pocock, 1895 — Afghanistan, Pakistan
 Galeodes agilis Pocock, 1895 — India
 Galeodes anatoliae Turk, 1960 — Turkey
 Galeodes annandalei Hirst, 1908 — India, Pakistan
 Galeodes arabs C.L. Koch, 1842 — North Africa, Middle East
 Galeodes araneoides (Pallas, 1772) — Middle East, Turkmenistan, Afghanistan, Kazakhstan, Ukraine, Armenia, Azerbaijan
 Galeodes armeniacus Birula, 1929 — Turkey, Armenia, Azerbaijan
 Galeodes ater (Roewer, 1960) — Afghanistan
 Galeodes atriceps Roewer, 1934 — Iran, Israel
 Galeodes atroluteus (Roewer, 1960) — Afghanistan
 Galeodes atrospinatus (Roewer, 1941) — Pakistan
 Galeodes aulicus Hirst, 1908 — Iran
 Galeodes auronitens Birula, 1905 — Iran
 Galeodes australis Pocock, 1900 — India
 Galeodes babylonicus Roewer, 1934 — Iraq, Israel
 Galeodes bacillatus Birula, 1905 — Iran
 Galeodes bacillifer Pocock, 1900 — Afghanistan, Iran, Pakistan
 Galeodes bacilliferoides Roewer, 1934 — Iran, Iraq, Pakistan
 Galeodes bactrianus Birula, 1937 — Kazakhstan, Tajikistan, Uzbekistan
 Galeodes barbarus Lucas, 1849 — North Africa
 Galeodes belutschistanus (Roewer, 1934) — Afghanistan, Pakistan
 Galeodes bengalicus (Roewer, 1934) — India
 Galeodes bicolor Roewer, 1934 — Israel, Pakistan
 Galeodes blanchardi Simon, 1891 — Algeria, Libya, Morocco, Togo, Tunisia
 Galeodes bocharicus Roewer, 1934 — Uzbekistan
 Galeodes bogojavlenskii Birula, 1906 — Iraq, Israel, Tajikistan, Uzbekistan
 Galeodes bubi Birula, 1937 — Uzbekistan
 Galeodes caspius Birula, 1890 — Central Asia, Azerbaijan, China, Iran, Israel
 Galeodes chitralensis Hirst, 1908 — Pakistan
 Galeodes citrinus Pocock, 1895 — Iran, Pakistan
 Galeodes clavatus Roewer, 1934 — Tunisia
 Galeodes claviger Kraus, 1959 — Iran
 Galeodes conversus Roewer, 1934 — Azerbaijan, Turkey
 Galeodes crassichelis Roewer, 1934 — Tunisia
 Galeodes ctenogaster (Roewer, 1934) — India
 Galeodes ctenoides Roewer, 1934 — Iran
 Galeodes cursor (Roewer, 1934) — Pakistan
 Galeodes dahlahensis Harvey, 2002 — Afghanistan
 Galeodes darendensis Harvey, 2002 — Turkey
 Galeodes darius Pocock, 1895 — Iraq, Israel
 Galeodes dekanicus (Roewer, 1934) — India
 Galeodes dellacaveae Harvey, 2002 — Somalia
 Galeodes discolor Kraepelin, 1899 — Iran
 Galeodes distinctus (Roewer, 1934) — Lebanon
 Galeodes edentatus Benoit, 1964 — Sudan
 Galeodes egregius Roewer, 1934 — Azerbaijan
 Galeodes elegans Roewer, 1934 — North Macedonia
 Galeodes ephippiatus Roewer, 1941 — Iran
 Galeodes excelsius (Lawrence, 1956) — Afghanistan
 Galeodes fatalis (Lichtenstein, 1796) — Afghanistan, Bangladesh, India
 Galeodes fessanus (Roewer, 1934) — Libya
 Galeodes festivus Hirst, 1908 — Iran
 Galeodes flavivittatus (Roewer, 1934) — Algeria
 Galeodes forcipatus Roewer, 1934 — Turkey
 Galeodes franki (Kraus, 1959) — Iran
 Galeodes fremitans (Roewer, 1934) — Pakistan
 Galeodes fumigatus Walter, 1889 — Iran, Turkmenistan
 Galeodes graecus C.L. Koch, 1842 — Armenia, Bulgaria, Cyprus, Egypt, Greece, Syria, Turkey
 Galeodes granti Pocock, 1903 — Egypt, Ethiopia, Israel, Sudan, Syria, Yemen
 Galeodes gravelyi (Roewer, 1934) — India
 Galeodes gromovi Harvey, 2002 — Azerbaijan, Iraq, Turkey
 Galeodes hakkariensis Erdek, 2021 — Turkey
 Galeodes hellenicus Roewer, 1934 — Greece
 Galeodes indicus Pocock, 1900 — India
 Galeodes inermis (Caporiacco, 1941) — Ethiopia
 Galeodes insidiator (Roewer, 1934) — Yemen
 Galeodes interjectus (Roewer, 1960) — Afghanistan
 Galeodes intermedius (Frade, 1948) — Guinea-Bissau
 Galeodes interritus Roewer, 1934 — Iran
 Galeodes karunensis Birula, 1905 — Iran
 Galeodes kermanensis Birula, 1905 — Iran
 Galeodes koeiena Lawrence, 1956 — Afghanistan
 Galeodes kozlovi Birula, 1911 — China, Mongolia, Turkmenistan, Uzbekistan
 Galeodes kraepelini Roewer, 1934 — Egypt
 Galeodes krausi Harvey, 2002 — Iran
 Galeodes lacertosus Roewer, 1934 — Iraq, Saudi Arabia, Yemen
 Galeodes laevipalpis Birula, 1905 — Uzbekistan
 Galeodes laniator Roewer, 1934 — Iraq, Israel
 Galeodes lapidosus Roewer, 1934 — Turkey
 Galeodes lawrencei Harvey, 2002 — Iraq
 Galeodes levyi Harvey, 2002 — Israel, Saudi Arabia, Syria
 Galeodes limitatus (Roewer, 1960) — Afghanistan
 Galeodes lindbergi Roewer, 1960 — Afghanistan
 Galeodes litigiosus Roewer, 1934 — Yemen
 Galeodes loeffleri Roewer, 1952 — Iran
 Galeodes luteipalpis (Roewer, 1960) — Afghanistan
 Galeodes lybicus Roewer, 1941 — Libya
 Galeodes lycaonis Turk, 1960 — Turkey
 Galeodes macmahoni Pocock, 1900 — Afghanistan, Iran, Pakistan
 Galeodes marginatus Roewer, 1961 — Turkey
 Galeodes mauryi Harvey, 2002 — Afghanistan
 Galeodes medusae Turk, 1960 — Egypt
 Galeodes melanalis Roewer, 1934 — Pakistan
 Galeodes melanopalpus (Roewer, 1934) — Pakistan
 Galeodes minimus Roewer, 1934 — Morocco
 Galeodes minitor Roewer, 1934 — Morocco
 Galeodes mongolicus Roewer, 1934 — Mongolia
 Galeodes montivagans Roewer, 1934 — China
 Galeodes mosconibronzii (Caporiacco, 1937) — Somalia
 Galeodes nachitschevanicus Aliev, 1985 — Azerbaijan
 Galeodes nigrichelis (Roewer, 1934) — Azerbaijan
 Galeodes notatus (Roewer, 1960) — Afghanistan
 Galeodes olivieri Simon, 1879 — Algeria, Mauritania, Morocco, Niger, Senegal, Togo, Tunisia
 Galeodes orientalis Stoliczka, 1869 — Syria, India
 Galeodes pallescens Hirst, 1908 — India
 Galeodes palpalis Roewer, 1934 — Tunisia
 Galeodes parvus Roewer, 1934 — Pakistan
 Galeodes perotis Roewer, 1934 — Cameroon
 Galeodes philippovi (Birula, 1941) — Yemen
 Galeodes philippoviczi Birula, 1937 — Turkmenistan
 Galeodes pinkasi Turk, 1960 — Jordan
 Galeodes pirzadanus (Lawrence, 1956) — Afghanistan
 Galeodes pococki Birula, 1905 — Iran, Pakistan
 Galeodes przevalskii Birula, 1905 — China, Kazakhstan, Uzbekistan
 Galeodes pugnator (Roewer, 1934) — Pakistan
 Galeodes pusillus (Roewer, 1934) — Algeria, Israel
 Galeodes rapax (Roewer, 1934) — Kyrgyzstan or Uzbekistan, China, Kazakhstan
 Galeodes reimoseri Roewer, 1934 — Ethiopia
 Galeodes revestitus Roewer, 1934 — Morocco
 Galeodes rhamses Roewer, 1934 — Egypt
 Galeodes rhodicola Roewer, 1941 — Greece
 Galeodes roeweri Turk, 1948 — Israel
 Galeodes rufogriseus (Roewer, 1960) — Afghanistan
 Galeodes rufulus Pocock, 1900 — Pakistan, India
 Galeodes ruptor Roewer, 1934 — Greece, Turkey
 Galeodes sabulosus Pocock, 1900 — India, Pakistan
 Galeodes sarpolensis Harvey, 2002 — Afghanistan
 Galeodes schach Birula, 1905 — Turkey, Iran
 Galeodes schendicus Roewer, 1934 — Sudan
 Galeodes scythicus Roewer, 1934 — Uzbekistan or Turkmenistan
 Galeodes sedulus Roewer, 1934 — China
 Galeodes sejugatus (Roewer, 1934) — Kyrgyzstan or Uzbekistan, China, Kazakhstan
 Galeodes separandus Roewer, 1934 — Turkey
 Galeodes setipes Birula, 1905 — Uzbekistan
 Galeodes setulosus Birula, 1937 — Tajikistan, Uzbekistan
 Galeodes signatus Roewer, 1934 — Pakistan
 Galeodes simplex Roewer, 1934 — Tunisia
 Galeodes smirnovi Birula, 1937 — Turkmenistan, Uzbekistan
 Galeodes somalicus Roewer, 1934 — Somalia
 Galeodes spectabilis (Roewer, 1934) — Pakistan
 Galeodes starmuehlneri Roewer, 1952 — Iran
 Galeodes striatipalpis (Roewer, 1960) — Afghanistan
 Galeodes subbarbarus Caporiacco, 1941 — Ethiopia
 Galeodes subsimilis Roewer, 1934 — Turkey
 Galeodes sulfuripes Roewer, 1934 — Iraq, Israel
 Galeodes sulphureopilosus Birula, 1905 — Tajikistan, Uzbekistan
 Galeodes tangkharzarensis Harvey, 2002 — Afghanistan
 Galeodes tarabulus (Roewer, 1934) — Libya
 Galeodes taurus (Roewer, 1934) — Turkey
 Galeodes testaceus (Roewer, 1960) — Afghanistan
 Galeodes theodori Turk, 1960 — Egypt
 Galeodes tillmani (Whittick, 1939) — Somalia
 Galeodes timbuktus (Roewer, 1934) — Mali, Nigeria
 Galeodes toelgi Werner, 1922 — Turkey
 Galeodes trichotichnus (Roewer, 1934) — Iran
 Galeodes trinkleri (Roewer, 1934) — Afghanistan
 Galeodes tripolitanus (Roewer, 1934) — Libya, Morocco
 Galeodes truculentus Pocock, 1899 — Iran
 Galeodes turanus Roewer, 1934 — Uzbekistan
 Galeodes turcmenicus Birula, 1937 — Azerbaijan, Kazakhstan, Turkmenistan
 Galeodes turkestanus Kraepelin, 1899 — Kazakhstan, Turkmenistan, Uzbekistan
 Galeodes turki Harvey, 2002 — India
 Galeodes tuxeni (Lawrence, 1956) — Afghanistan
 Galeodes uzbecus Roewer, 1941 — Kazakhstan, Tajikistan, Uzbekistan
 Galeodes veemi Whittick, 1939 — Egypt
 Galeodes venator Simon, 1879 — Algeria, Morocco, Tunisia
 Galeodes ventralis Roewer, 1934 — Yemen
 Galeodes versicolor (Lawrence, 1956) — Afghanistan
 Galeodes viridipilosus Roewer, 1941 — Turkey
 Galeodes vittatus (Roewer, 1941) — Iran
 Galeodes wadaicus Roewer, 1934 — Chad
 Galeodes zarudnyi Birula, 1937 — Kazakhstan, Turkmenistan

References 

Solifugae genera
Arachnids of Europe
Arachnid genera
Solifugae